Eric Horgan (born 27 August 1947) is an Irish equestrian. He competed in two events at the 1976 Summer Olympics.

References

External links
 

1947 births
Living people
Irish male equestrians
Olympic equestrians of Ireland
Equestrians at the 1976 Summer Olympics
Place of birth missing (living people)